Ravener may refer to:

 Ravener, a bird of prey
 Ravener, someone who preys or plunders
 Raveners, game characters from Warhammer 40,000, see Tyranids
 Raveners, role-playing game characters from Demon: The Fallen